An inertia damper is a device that counters or damps the effects of inertia and other forces and motion. The damper does not negate the forces but either absorbs or redirects them by other means. For example, a large suspended mass may be used to absorb several short-duration large forces, and to reapply those forces as a smaller force over a longer period.

The phrase inertial damper is actually misused in science fiction to describe a device that negates inertia and removes it from surrounding mass. It is more properly described as inertia negation.

Real-world applications and devices 

Inertial compensators are also used in simulators or rides, making them more realistic by creating artificial sensations of acceleration and other movement.  The Disneyland ride “Star Tours: The Adventure Continues” is a fair example of this principle.

There are many types of physical devices that can act as inertia dampers:
 Ballast
 Brakes - kinetic energy redirected as heating due to friction between surfaces pressed together
 Counterweight - a mass which by mechanical means is caused to move in opposition to the motion of some other mass, partially negating forces such as gravity, that are acting upon the primary mass
 Dogbone damper - absorbs resonant wave motions in wire and support cables
 Flywheel - rotational forces
 Pendulum - oscillatory forces
 Shock absorber - motion redirected as heating of viscous oil forced through a restrictive passage
 Rotary damper - rotary motion is dissipated as heat in a highly viscous fluid or gel. May use a smooth surface rotating cylinder and a smooth surface stationary interior wall with fluid/gel between. For more forceful motion absorption and higher surface area, a paddle wheel or toothed gear is used, with a similarly ribbed or studded stationary interior wall to more forcefully grip the fluid/gel.

References 

Force
Mass